Krishna Rajendra Market or K. R. Market is a Namma Metro station on the Green Line serving K. R. Market, Bangalore. It was opened to the public on 18 June 2017.

In January 2017, The Hindu reported that the station would most likely be named Fort (Kote) Station. The station is located close to several heritage sites such as Tipu Sultan's Summer Palace, his armoury in Kalasipalyam, the mud fort, Kote Venkataramana Swamy temple, and the century-old Victoria and Vanivilas hospitals. The BMRCL plans to integrate the station with the nearby landmarks, and recreate a historic ambience at the station by displaying a cannon used by Tipu Sultan at the station.

Station layout

Facilities

List of available ATM at Krishna Rajendra Market metro station are as follows:-
 Kotak mahindra ATM 
 Digi bank ATM
 State bank of India ATM in Lakshmi Complex (Front of Bangalore Medical College exit)

Entry/Exits
There are 5 Entry/Exit points – A, B, C, D and E. Commuters can use either of the points for their travel.

 Entry/Exit point A: Towards Kalasipalayam side
 Entry/Exit point B: Towards KR Market side
 Entry/Exit point C: Towards ENT Govt. Hospital side 
 Entry/Exit point D: Towards Vanivilas Hospital side
 Entry/Exit point E: Towards Bangalore Fort side

See also
Bangalore
List of Namma Metro stations
Transport in Karnataka
List of metro systems
List of rapid transit systems in India

References

External links

 Bangalore Metro Rail Corporation Ltd. (Official site) 
 UrbanRail.Net – descriptions of all metro systems in the world, each with a schematic map showing all stations.

Namma Metro stations
Railway stations in India opened in 2017
2017 establishments in Karnataka
Railway stations in Bangalore